Running in the Family is the seventh studio album by British band Level 42, released in 1987. It features the UK hit singles: "Lessons in Love" (which reached No. 3 in May 1986), "Running in the Family" (No. 6 in February 1987), "To Be with You Again" (No. 10 in April '87), "It's Over" (No. 10, in September 1987) and "Children Say" (No. 22 at the end of 1987). All five singles peaked in the Top 10 in the Netherlands. "Lessons in Love" peaked at No. 1 in Germany, South Africa, Switzerland and Denmark. This was the last Level 42 album of the 1980s to feature brothers Phil (drums) (until Forever Now in 1994) and Rowland 'Boon' Gould (guitar) (until his guest appearance on Retroglide in 2006) who had cited dissatisfaction with the musical direction of the band and exhaustion as departure reasons.

Later in 1987, the Platinum Edition of the album was issued. The CD and cassette versions replaced "Lessons in Love", "Running in the Family" and "It's Over" with remixed versions, and added remixes of "Something About You" and "World Machine" from Level 42's previous album. On vinyl, the remixes were featured on one 33 rpm record which was shrink-wrapped to the standard edition of the album.

Also in 1987, the group released the video collection Family of Five (with the music videos of the five singles from Running in the Family) exclusively in the United Kingdom.

Running in the Family was a big international success, reaching the Top 10 in numerous countries and the Top 25 in the US; in the UK, it was certified 2× Platinum by the BPI.

In 2012, the album was remastered and re-released to celebrate the 25th anniversary of its original release.

Track listing
Side one
 "Lessons in Love" (Wally Badarou, Rowland Gould, Mark King) – 4:04
 "Children Say" (King, Mike Lindup, Phil Gould) – 4:53
 "Running in the Family" (P. Gould, Badarou, King) – 6:12
 "It's Over" (King, R. Gould, Badarou) – 6:02
Side two
 "To Be with You Again" (King, R. Gould) – 5:19
 "Two Solitudes" (King, P. Gould, Lindup) – 5:17 
 "Fashion Fever" (King, R. Gould) – 4:35
 "The Sleepwalkers" (King, P. Gould) – 6:02
Bonus track
 "Freedom Someday" (King, P. Gould, R. Gould, Lindup) – 6:20 (originally a bonus track on the CD and cassette)

2000 reissue bonus tracks
 "Lessons in Love" (Shep's Final Mix) – 5:45
"Children Say" (Slap Bass Mix) – 4:49
"To Be with You Again" (A.D.S.C. Mix) – 5:45
"Running in the Family" (HTL Dub) – 6:11

Personnel

Level 42 

 Mark King – lead vocals, bass guitar
 Mike Lindup – keyboards, backing vocals, lead vocals on "Two Solitudes"
 Rowland “Boon” Gould – guitars
 Phil Gould – drums

Additional musicians 

 Wally Badarou – keyboards, backing vocals
 Gary Barnacle – saxophone ("Lessons in Love")
 Krys Mach – saxophone ("Running in the Family")
 Julian Mendelsohn – additional backing vocals ("The Sleepwalkers")

Production 
 Level 42 – producers
 Wally Badarou – producer 
 Julian Mendelsohn – production assistant, engineer, mixing 
 Nicholas Froome – basic track recording (1, 2)
 Carlos Olms – digital engineer 
 Mike "Spike" Drake – technician 
 Kevin Metcalfe – mastering 
 The Town House (London) – mastering location 
 Eric Watson – photography 
 Paul Crockford – management 
 Paul King – management
 Outlaw Management – management company

Charts

Weekly charts

Year-end charts

Singles

Certifications

References

External links
Official Level 42's website
Level 42 discography

1987 albums
Level 42 albums
Albums produced by Wally Badarou
Polydor Records albums